The District Council of Dublin was a local government area in South Australia from 1873 to 1935, seated at Dublin.

History
The council was proclaimed on 27 November 1873. Its jurisdiction consisted of the whole Hundred of Dublin as well as that portion of the Hundred of Port Gawler north of the River Light. The inaugural councillors in 1873 were proclaimed as Noble Johnson, Weatherall Lindsay, William Wilson, John Lines, Richard J Loveday, and George Arnold.

On 1 May 1935, it was amalgamated with the district councils of Port Gawler (to the south) and Grace (to the east) to create the District Council of Light. The new district council was subsequently renamed as the District Council of Mallala in 1937 and again as the Adelaide Plains Council in 2016.

Chairmen
 
The following persons were elected to serve as chairman of the district council for the following terms:
 Not known 1873-75
 R.J. Loveday 1875-76 
 N. J. W. Lindsay 1876-77
 J. Porter 1877-80
 W. Simmons 1880-82
 N. J. W. Lindsay 1882-84
 H. White 184-87
 F. Diment 1887-88
 W. Chapman 1888-90
 W.H. Baker 1890-92
 G.M. Johnson 1892-94
 W.H. Baker 1894-98
 D. Parker 1898-99
 W.H. Baker  1899-1907

References

Dublin, District Council of
1873 establishments in Australia
1935 disestablishments in Australia